Carpocoris purpureipennis is a species of shield bug of the family Pentatomidae, subfamily Pentatominae.

Subspecies
 Carpocoris purpureipennis purpureipennis (De Geer, 1773) 
 Carpocoris purpureipennis sexmaculatus Péneau, 1921

Distribution and habitat

This species can be found in most of Europe and in central Asia.

Habitat
These shield bugs live in meadows, roadsides, edges of forests and gardens.

Description
The pronotum is wide with a regular punctuation, almost straight and slightly pointed lateral margins with blunt tips. Also the lateral edges of the scutellum are nearly straight.

The body color varies from purple or reddish-brown to yellowish. The pronotum angles are black. Moreover pronotum usually shows short longitudinal black stripes, while the scutellum may have some contrasting black spots. Antennae are black and legs are orange.

This species is quite similar and can be confused with Carpocoris pudicus, Carpocoris fuscispinus and Carpocoris mediterraneus.

Biology

Both the adult bugs and their nymphs are polyphagous. Adults mainly feed on juices of Cirsium arvense and nectar of Leucanthemum vulgare.

In late May-early June these insects lay eggs on various herbaceous plants of the family of cereals (Poaceae), legumes (Fabaceae), crucifers (Brassicaceae) and composites (Asteraceae).

These bugs are considered an agricultural pest. They can damage soybean, beans, cabbage, carrots, raspberries, strawberries, potatoes, radish, wheat and apple trees.

Bibliography
 Rider D.A., 2004 - Family Pentatomidae - Catalogue of the Heteroptera of the Palaearctic Region

References

External links
 EOL
 Meloidae
 INPN
NCBI
 Tout un monde dans mon jardin

Pentatomidae
Insects described in 1773
Hemiptera of Asia
Hemiptera of Europe
Taxa named by Charles De Geer